MRCA may refer to:
Member of the Royal College of Anaesthetists, United Kingdom 
Most recent common ancestor, a term referring to the most recent ancestor any set of organisms are directly descended from
Mid-right coronary artery, one of several coronary arteries. 
Multirole combat aircraft, the concept of an aircraft that can be used for more than one combat role; particularly:
The NATO Multi-Role Combat Aircraft – the project that became the Panavia Tornado
Indian MRCA competition, an ongoing competition to supply the Indian Air Force with 126 multirole combat aircraft